The Mallorca Golf Open was a professional golf tournament that was initially held 21–24 October 2021 at Golf Santa Ponsa in Mallorca, Spain.

The tournament was intended to be a one-off event and was the first European Tour played in Mallorca since the Iberdrola Open in 2011.

Jeff Winther shot 62 twice on way to a one-shot victory.

In August 2022, it was announced that the tournament would return for a second time.

Winners

References

External links
Event page on the official site of the European Tour

Former European Tour events
Golf tournaments in Spain
Sport in Mallorca
2021 establishments in Spain